Recorded Fall 1961 is a 1961 studio album by American jazz musicians Bob Brookmeyer and Stan Getz.

Reception
The Allmusic review by Scott Yanow awarded the album four and a half stars and stated: "As usual the cool-toned tenor blends in very well with the valve trombonist and, backed by a fine rhythm section...This little-known session is often quite memorable".

In Downbeat, Ira Gitler gave the record a perfect five-star rating and noted that the album marked two occasions: "the first recording by Getz since his return to the United States [and] a reunion with Brookmeyer, his partner of the mid-’50s."

Regarding their performances, Gitler writes "Getz and Brookmeyer are mature players, and everything they do on this record is in perfect balance... the most important factor in the success of this set is the ease with which these men communicate their thoughts and feelings to the audience. It seems to flow out and by the same token, right in."

Track listing
 "Minuet Circa '61" (Bob Brookmeyer) - 10:38
 "Who Could Care?" (Brookmeyer) - 4:46
 "Nice Work If You Can Get It" (George Gershwin, Ira Gershwin) - 5:58
 "Thump, Thump, Thump" (Brookmeyer) - 6:52
 "A Nightingale Sang in Berkeley Square" (Eric Maschwitz, Manning Sherwin) - 6:59
 "Love Jumped Out" (Buck Clayton) - 7:46

Personnel
Bob Brookmeyer - valve trombone
Stan Getz - tenor saxophone
Steve Kuhn - piano
John Neves - double bass
Roy Haynes - drums
Production
Nat Hentoff - liner notes
Loren Schoenberg
Tommy Nola - engineer
Creed Taylor - producer

References 

Verve Records albums
Albums produced by Creed Taylor
Stan Getz albums
Bob Brookmeyer albums
1961 albums